Fort George was the name of a provincial electoral district in the Canadian province of British Columbia from 1916 to 1975.  Its successor ridings were Prince George South and Prince George North.

Demographics

Notable MLAs 

 Ray Gillis Williston (Social Credit, 1953–1972)

Electoral history 
Note:  Winners in each election are in bold.

|- bgcolor="white"
!align="right" colspan=3|Total valid votes
!align="right"|1,149  
!align="right"|100.00%
!align="right"|
|- bgcolor="white"
!align="right" colspan=3|Total rejected ballots
!align="right"|
!align="right"|
!align="right"|
|- bgcolor="white"
!align="right" colspan=3|Turnout
!align="right"|%
!align="right"|
!align="right"|
|- bgcolor="white"
!align="right" colspan=7|1 McInnis received the unofficial support of the Liberals after their candidate, C.A. Gaskill, withdrew in order to increase the chances of defeating Ross. Gillett was part of a breakaway Conservative group. Alleged irregularities led to a commission of inquiry which found the charges not substantiated.
|}

 
|Liberal
|Henry George Thomas Perry
|align="right"|1,080
|align="right"|46.67%
|align="right"|
|align="right"|unknown

|- bgcolor="white"
!align="right" colspan=3|Total valid votes
!align="right"|2,314 
!align="right"|100.00%
!align="right"|
|- bgcolor="white"
!align="right" colspan=3|Total rejected ballots
!align="right"|
!align="right"|
!align="right"|
|- bgcolor="white"
!align="right" colspan=3|Turnout
!align="right"|%
!align="right"|
!align="right"|
|- bgcolor="white"
!align="right" colspan=7|2 Endorsed by Provincial Party.
|}  	  	  	 

 
|Liberal
|Henry George Thomas Perry
|align="right"|1,394 	 	
|align="right"|48.39%
|align="right"|
|align="right"|unknown
|- bgcolor="white"
!align="right" colspan=3|Total valid votes
!align="right"|2,881 	
!align="right"|100.00%
!align="right"|
|- bgcolor="white"
!align="right" colspan=3|Total rejected ballots
!align="right"|47
!align="right"|
!align="right"|
|- bgcolor="white"
!align="right" colspan=3|Turnout
!align="right"|%
!align="right"|
!align="right"|
|}

 
|Co-operative Commonwealth Fed.
|John McInnis
|align="right"|1,170 	 		
|align="right"|40.39%
|align="right"|
|align="right"|unknown
 
|Liberal
|Henry George Thomas Perry
|align="right"|1,493
|align="right"|51.54%
|align="right"|
|align="right"|unknown
|- bgcolor="white"
!align="right" colspan=3|Total valid votes
!align="right"|2,897 
!align="right"|100.00%
!align="right"|
|- bgcolor="white"
!align="right" colspan=3|Total rejected ballots
!align="right"|57
!align="right"|
!align="right"|
|- bgcolor="white"
!align="right" colspan=3|Turnout
!align="right"|%
!align="right"|
!align="right"|
|}

 
|Co-operative Commonwealth Fed.
|James Warren Penberthy
|align="right"|928 	 		 		
|align="right"|35.58%
|align="right"|
|align="right"|unknown
 
|Liberal
|Henry George Thomas Perry
|align="right"|1,334
|align="right"|51.15%
|align="right"|
|align="right"|unknown

|- bgcolor="white"
!align="right" colspan=3|Total valid votes
!align="right"|2,608 		
!align="right"|100.00%
!align="right"|
|- bgcolor="white"
!align="right" colspan=3|Total rejected ballots
!align="right"|45
!align="right"|
!align="right"|
|- bgcolor="white"
!align="right" colspan=3|Turnout
!align="right"|%
!align="right"|
!align="right"|
|}

 
|Co-operative Commonwealth Fed.
|John McInnis
|align="right"|1,726
|align="right"|55.73%
|align="right"|
|align="right"|unknown

|- bgcolor="white"
!align="right" colspan=3|Total valid votes
!align="right"|3,097 	  
!align="right"|100.00%
!align="right"|
|- bgcolor="white"
!align="right" colspan=3|Total rejected ballots
!align="right"|58
!align="right"|
!align="right"|
|- bgcolor="white"
!align="right" colspan=3|Turnout
!align="right"|%
!align="right"|
!align="right"|
|}	 

 
|Co-operative Commonwealth Fed.
|John McInnis
|align="right"|2,167 			
|align="right"|40.14%
|align="right"|
|align="right"|unknown
|- bgcolor="white"
!align="right" colspan=3|Total valid votes
!align="right"|5,399 
!align="right"|100.00%
!align="right"|
|- bgcolor="white"
!align="right" colspan=3|Total rejected ballots
!align="right"|176
!align="right"|
!align="right"|
|- bgcolor="white"
!align="right" colspan=3|Turnout
!align="right"|%
!align="right"|
!align="right"|
|}	

 
|Liberal
|Henry Robson Bowman
|align="right"|2,022         	 		
|align="right"|33.73%
|align="right"|2,468
|align="right"|47.21%
|align="right"|
|align="right"|unknown

 
|Co-operative Commonwealth Fed.
|John McInnis
|align="right"|1,593   			
|align="right"|26.57%
|align="right"| - 
|align="right"| -.- %
|align="right"|
|align="right"|unknown
 
|Conservative
|Cyril Westaway
|align="right"|371           	
|align="right"|6.19%
|align="right"| - 
|align="right"| - %
|align="right"|
|align="right"|unknown
|- bgcolor="white"
!align="right" colspan=3|Total valid votes
!align="right"|5,995        
!align="right"|100.00%
!align="right"|5,228  	
!align="right"| - %
!align="right"|
|- bgcolor="white"
!align="right" colspan=3|Total rejected ballots
!align="right"|345
!align="right"|
!align="right"|
!align="right"|
!align="right"|
|- bgcolor="white"
!align="right" colspan=3|Turnout
!align="right"|%
!align="right"|
!align="right"|
|- bgcolor="white"
!align="right" colspan=7|2  Preferential ballot.  First and final counts of three shown only.
|}  	  	  	 

 
|Co-operative Commonwealth Fed.
|Frank Bond
|align="right"|1,677 		 	 	 	 	 	    
|align="right"|25.267%
|align="right"| -    		
|align="right"| -.- %
|align="right"|
|align="right"|unknown
 
|Liberal
|Garvin James Edward Dezell
|align="right"|1,802 	 	 			 		
|align="right"|27.14%
|align="right"|2,173 
|align="right"|38.24%
|align="right"|
|align="right"|unknown

|- bgcolor="white"
!align="right" colspan=3|Total valid votes
!align="right"|6,639 	  		 	 	  		 
!align="right"|100.00%
!align="right"|5,682  	
!align="right"| - %
!align="right"|
|- bgcolor="white"
!align="right" colspan=3|Total rejected ballots
!align="right"|308
!align="right"|
!align="right"|
!align="right"|
!align="right"|
|- bgcolor="white"
!align="right" colspan=3|Turnout
!align="right"|%
!align="right"|
!align="right"|
|- bgcolor="white"
!align="right" colspan=7|3  Preferential ballot.  First and final counts of two shown only.
|}

 
|Co-operative Commonwealth Fed.
|Carl Waldemar Kienzie
|align="right"|1,304 	 	
|align="right"|20.20%
|align="right"|
|align="right"|unknown
 
|Liberal
|Frank Samuel Perry
|align="right"|1,376 			 	
|align="right"|21.32%
|align="right"|
|align="right"|unknown

|- bgcolor="white"
!align="right" colspan=3|Total valid votes
!align="right"|6,454 	
!align="right"|100.00%
!align="right"|
|- bgcolor="white"
!align="right" colspan=3|Total rejected ballots
!align="right"|236
!align="right"|
!align="right"|
|- bgcolor="white"
!align="right" colspan=3|Turnout
!align="right"|%
!align="right"|
!align="right"|
|}

 
|Progressive Conservative
|John Anthony Coates
|align="right"|346 	 	 	
|align="right"|3.78%
|align="right"|
|align="right"|unknown
 
|Liberal
|Holger Enemark
|align="right"|1,416 	 	
|align="right"|15.45%
|align="right"|
|align="right"|unknown
 
|Co-operative Commonwealth Fed.
|William Kenneth Rutherford
|align="right"|2,336 	
|align="right"|25.49%
|align="right"|
|align="right"|unknown

|- bgcolor="white"
!align="right" colspan=3|Total valid votes
!align="right"|9,164 
!align="right"|100.00%
!align="right"|
|- bgcolor="white"
!align="right" colspan=3|Total rejected ballots
!align="right"|163
!align="right"|
!align="right"|
|- bgcolor="white"
!align="right" colspan=3|Turnout
!align="right"|%
!align="right"|
!align="right"|
|}

 
|Liberal
|Thomas Raymond Cullinane
|align="right"|961 		
|align="right"|11.00%
|align="right"|
|align="right"|unknown

 
|Progressive Conservative
|Dudley Erwin Sawley
|align="right"|739 	 		
|align="right"|8.46%
|align="right"|
|align="right"|unknown

|- bgcolor="white"
!align="right" colspan=3|Total valid votes
!align="right"|8,733 	 	
!align="right"|100.00%
!align="right"|
|- bgcolor="white"
!align="right" colspan=3|Total rejected ballots
!align="right"|72
!align="right"|
!align="right"|
|- bgcolor="white"
!align="right" colspan=3|Turnout
!align="right"|%
!align="right"|
!align="right"|
|}	  	

 
|Liberal
|Henry Allan Hope
|align="right"|1,313 			
|align="right"|12.63%
|align="right"|
|align="right"|unknown

|- bgcolor="white"
!align="right" colspan=3|Total valid votes
!align="right"|10,397 	
!align="right"|100.00%
!align="right"|
|- bgcolor="white"
!align="right" colspan=3|Total rejected ballots
!align="right"|101
!align="right"|
!align="right"|
|- bgcolor="white"
!align="right" colspan=3|Turnout
!align="right"|%
!align="right"|
!align="right"|
|}	

 
|Liberal
|Tex Cyril Enemark
|align="right"|1,291 	 			
|align="right"|8.26%
|align="right"|
|align="right"|unknown

|- bgcolor="white"
!align="right" colspan=3|Total valid votes
!align="right"|15,639 	 	
!align="right"|100.00%
!align="right"|
|- bgcolor="white"
!align="right" colspan=3|Total rejected ballots
!align="right"|159
!align="right"|
!align="right"|
|- bgcolor="white"
!align="right" colspan=3|Turnout
!align="right"|%
!align="right"|
!align="right"|
|}	

 
|Liberal
|Ronald L. Racette
|align="right"|710 	 	 			
|align="right"|3.37%
|align="right"|
|align="right"|unknown

 
|Progressive Conservative
|John Galt Wilson
|align="right"|3,754 	 		 	
|align="right"|17.80%
|align="right"|
|align="right"|unknown
|- bgcolor="white"
!align="right" colspan=3|Total valid votes
!align="right"|21,093 		 	
!align="right"|100.00%
!align="right"|
|- bgcolor="white"
!align="right" colspan=3|Total rejected ballots
!align="right"|252
!align="right"|
!align="right"|
|- bgcolor="white"
!align="right" colspan=3|Turnout
!align="right"|%
!align="right"|
!align="right"|
|}	

 
|Progressive Conservative
|Alan Graham Anderton
|align="right"|1,273 	 	 		 	
|align="right"|4.41%
|align="right"|
|align="right"|unknown
 
|Liberal
|Frederick Joseph House
|align="right"|1,695 	 	 	 			
|align="right"|5.87%
|align="right"|
|align="right"|unknown

|- bgcolor="white"
!align="right" colspan=3|Total valid votes
!align="right"|28,865		 	
!align="right"|100.00%
!align="right"|
|- bgcolor="white"
!align="right" colspan=3|Total rejected ballots
!align="right"|306
!align="right"|
!align="right"|
|- bgcolor="white"
!align="right" colspan=3|Turnout
!align="right"|%
!align="right"|
!align="right"|
|}

Sources 

Elections BC Historical Returns

Former provincial electoral districts of British Columbia